Andringitra is a genus of flowering plants belonging to the family Malvaceae.

Its native range is Madagascar.

Species:

Andringitra leiomacrantha 
Andringitra leucomacrantha 
Andringitra macrantha 
Andringitra moratii 
Andringitra muscosa 
Andringitra seyrigii

References

Malvaceae
Malvaceae genera